Midland Mall is an enclosed shopping mall serving Midland, Michigan, United States. Opened in 1991, the mall's anchor stores are Target, Fantastic Finds, Barnes & Noble, Dunham's Sports, and Planet Fitness. A fourth anchor store spot, once occupied by Sears, lies empty. The mall is managed by the Kohan Retail Investment Group.

History
Richard E. Jacobs group built the Midland Mall, which was originally anchored by J. C. Penney, Elder-Beerman, Target, and Sears.

Barnes & Noble opened in the JCPenney wing in 2003. A Steve & Barry's store was added in the same wing and closed in 2008. The space became Dunham's Sports in 2011.

Although Midland Mall is the smallest of the three malls in the Tri-Cities (which also comprises Bay City and Saginaw), it also had the lowest vacancy rate of the three. The mall filled several vacancies in 2007 by adding Journeys, a Vanity clothing store and two eateries.  All of these tenants have since closed. The Elder-Beerman store was renamed Younkers in 2012. Shoe Show opened a Shoe Dept. Encore store next to Younkers in mid-2015. Sears closed in July 2016. On March 17, 2017, it was announced that JCPenney would also be closing as part of a plan to close 138 stores nationwide. The store closed on July 31, 2017. On April 18, 2018, it was announced that Younkers' parent company The Bon-Ton would be going out of business. The store closed on August 31, 2018, leaving Target as the only anchor left.

Despite the fact that chain stores continue to leave the mall, businesses are still opening at Midland Mall. In 2020, Fantastic Finds, a resale store, opened in the former Younkers space. In addition, Planet Fitness moved their existing Midland location to the former JCPenney in 2020.

References

External links
Midland Mall

Shopping malls in Michigan
Shopping malls established in 1991
Midland, Michigan
Buildings and structures in Midland County, Michigan
Tourist attractions in Midland County, Michigan
Kohan Retail Investment Group